Nowhere Special is a 2020 internationally co-produced drama film written, directed, and produced by Uberto Pasolini. It stars James Norton and Daniel Lamont, set in Northern Ireland. The story follows John, a single parent to 4-year-old Michael, who must make arrangements for the care of his son when he is faced with the reality of terminal illness.

It had its world premiere at the Venice Film Festival on 10 September 2020, and was theatrically released in the United Kingdom on 16 July 2021.

Cast
 James Norton as John
 Daniel Lamont as Michael
 Eileen O'Higgins as Shona
 Valerie O'Connor as Ella
 Valene Kane as Celia
 Keith McErlean as Phillip
 Siobhán McSweeney as Pam
 Chris Corrigan as Gerry
 Niamh McGrady as Lorraine
 Caolan Byrne as Trevor

Production
In September 2019, it was announced James Norton had joined the cast of the film, with Uberto Pasolini directing from a screenplay he wrote. Pasolini was inspired to write the script from a story he read about a terminally ill father who needed to find a new family for his son before dying.

Filming
Principal photography began in August 2019.

Release
The film had its world premiere at the Venice Film Festival on 10 September 2020. It was released in the United Kingdom on 16 July 2021 at Curzon Cinemas.

Critical reception
On review aggregator Rotten Tomatoes, Nowhere Special holds an approval rating of 100% based on 30 reviews.

In 2021, James Norton was nominated for a British Independent Film Award for Best Actor.

References

External links
 
 

2020 films
2020 drama films
British drama films
Italian drama films
Romanian drama films
2020 independent films
Films about father–son relationships
Films about adoption
Films set in Northern Ireland
Films shot in Belfast
Films shot in Northern Ireland
Icon Productions films
2020s English-language films
2020s British films
2020s Italian films